Selian may refer to:

 Selian River, a river in Tanzania
 Selian language, Baltic language spoken by the Eastern Baltic tribe of the Selonians